Gallamine triethiodide (Flaxedil) is a non-depolarising muscle relaxant. It acts by combining with the cholinergic receptor sites in muscle and competitively blocking the transmitter action of acetylcholine. Gallamine is a non-depolarising type of blocker as it binds to the acetylcholine receptor but does not have the biological activity of acetyl choline. Gallamine triethiodide has a parasympatholytic effect on the cardiac vagus nerve, which causes tachycardia and occasionally hypertension. Very high doses cause histamine release.

Gallamine triethiodide is commonly used to stabilize muscle contractions during surgical procedures.

It was developed by Daniel Bovet in 1947.

The pharmaceutical is no longer marketed in the United States, according to the FDA Orange Book.

See also
 Neuromuscular-blocking drug
 Curare

References 

Muscle relaxants
Nicotinic antagonists
Quaternary ammonium compounds
Phenol ethers
Neuromuscular blockers